Princess Olufemi-Kayode (also known as Modupe Olufemi-Kayode) is a Nigerian criminal justice psychologist and prominent child rights activist. Olufemi-Kayode became an Ashoka fellow in 2007. She is the Executive Director of Media Concern for Women and Children Initiative (MEDIACON), a non profit organisation (NGO) listed by the UNDP which works with child victims of sexual abuse and exploitation.

Early life and education
Princess is a child abuse survivor, who was abused several times by her close associates. In 1979, she wrote two poems about her child abuse experience.

Career
She worked as a columnist in The Punch newspaper, where she managed a column called "Princess Column".  She is an international speaker and lover of children. In 2000, she founded Media Concern Initiative for Women and Children, a non-governmental organisation for women and children that focuses in the field of sexual violence prevention and crisis response in Nigeria and Africa. She has appeared in various radio talk shows and television programmes. She became an Ashoka fellow in 2007.

References

External links
 Youtube
Media Concern Initiative

Living people
Year of birth missing (living people)
Women in Nigeria
Ashoka Fellows